A municipal election was held in Gatineau, Quebec, Canada on November 1, 2009 in conjunction with municipal elections across Quebec on that date. Elections were held for Mayor of Gatineau as well as for each of the 18 districts on Gatineau City Council.

Controversies
Signs in the Gatineau area-sponsoring Lucerne District Councillor candidate Barbara Charlebois posters were removed and vandalized due to her election poster being primarily in English. A similar act of vandalism was perpetrated on the offices of the Regional Association of West Quebecers, a not-for profit organization that support English-Speakers in the community,  of which Charlebois is vice-president. Jean-Roch Villemaire, a former provincial candidate for the extreme-separatist Parti indépendantiste, took responsibility for both situations.

Mayoral race
At 8:59 pm, CBC reported that Marc Bureau, the incumbent mayor of Gatineau had won the Gatineau mayoral race.

Aylmer District

Lucerne District

Deschênes District

Plateau–Manoir-des-Trembles District

Wright-Parc-de-la-Montagne District

l'Orée-du-Parc District

Saint-Raymond-Vanier District

Hull–Val-Tétreau District

Limbour District

Touraine District

Promenades District

Carrefour-de-l'Hôpital District

Versant District

Bellevue District

Sylvie Goneau was narrowly elected to city council in 2009. She had previously served as an assistant to Ottawa councillor Georges Bédard and worked as regional director of the Ambulance St-Jean. After the election, she was appointed as chair of the Commission permanente sur l'habitation.

Lac-Beauchamp District

la Rivière-Blanche District

Masson-Angers District

Buckingham District

References

External links
List of candidates
Official results (City of Gatineau)

2009 Quebec municipal elections
2009